Hinduism in North Macedonia is mainly represented by the Hare Krishna movement (ISKCON) and the Sathya Sai Baba Organisation. ISKCON and the Satya Sai Baba-Centre have been registered in Macedonia as a part of the Oriental religion.

Hare Krishna in Macedonia
ISKCON is a legally registered and recognized as a religious minority in Macedonia. The main center is located in Skopje, Ul:31 Br:33, nas. Volkovo, 1000 Skopje, with sympathizers throughout the country. Its first center was opened in 1988. Local members are frequently visited by devotees from other former Yugoslav countries, who are considerably larger in number.

In Macedonia, governments regularly invite Hare Krishna devotees whenever there is an occasion for various religious bodies to meet together. The deceased President Trajkovski invited members each time he met with leaders from other religious groups.

Sathya Sai Baba Organisation in Macedonia

The Sathya Sai Baba Organisation is a legally registered and recognized as a religious minority in Macedonia. The Macedonian Sathya Sai movement, much like the Hare Krishna devotees, has its roots at the end of the 1980s. At that time a group in Skopje was formed spontaneously. Now the Sathya Sai Organization has three centres in Skopje. There is a smaller group in Štip, and a sizable number of sympathizers in the rest of the country.

Sources
 
 [DNEVNIK Daily News]

Other Hindu Groups
 Chinmoy Mission

References

External links
Sathya Sai Baba Centres in North Macedonia
Chinmoy Mission in North Macedonia
Yoga in Daily Life in North Macedonia
Unofficial MySpace of ISKCON in North Macedonia; many pictures
Web Page of ISKCON in North Macedonia
Live broadcast from several temples from India in North Macedonia

North Macedonia
North Macedonia
Religion in North Macedonia